Jerry Friesen is a former award-winning linebacker in the Canadian Football League and is the special teams coordinator for the Saskatchewan Huskies.

University career
A graduate of University of Saskatchewan, Friesen was 3-time all-star with the Huskies. In 1994, he was inducted into the Huskie Wall of Fame.

Professional career
Friesen was drafted in the second round, 14th overall, by the Montreal Alouettes in the 1978 CFL Draft and played in 48 regular season games with them. He then joined his hometown Saskatchewan Roughriders for five years, winning the prestigious Tom Pate Memorial Award for outstanding community service in 1985.

Coaching career
Friesen took up coaching after his playing days. He started with alma mater as an assistant coach for the Saskatchewan Huskies for 10 seasons, winning the Vanier Cup in 1990. After a year as linebacker coach with the Saskatchewan Roughriders, he was the defensive coordinator with the Calgary Dinos. He next spent 10 years as head coach of the Alberta Golden Bears, being named CIS coach of the year in 2004, before he resigned to return to the Roughriders. He spent the 2011 season with the Roughriders, but was not retained following a disappointing season.

On March 11, 2013, Friesen was announced as the defensive coordinator for the UBC Thunderbirds. He spent two years with the Thunderbirds but was not retained following a head coaching change in 2015.

On May 2, 2017, it was announced that Friesen had re-joined his alma mater and was named the special teams coordinator for the Saskatchewan Huskies.

Awards
In 2008, Friesen was enshrined in the Saskatoon Sports Hall of Fame.

References

1955 births
Living people
Canadian football linebackers
Montreal Alouettes players
Saskatchewan Roughriders players
Saskatchewan Huskies football players
Players of Canadian football from Saskatchewan
Saskatchewan Roughriders coaches
Saskatchewan Huskies football coaches
Calgary Dinos football coaches
Alberta Golden Bears football coaches
UBC Thunderbirds football coaches